Françoise Hardy is a French singer and actress. It may also refer to:

Françoise Hardy (1962 album), Vogue LD 60030
Françoise Hardy (1963 album), Vogue FH 1
Françoise Hardy (1965 album), Vogue FH 3
Françoise Hardy in English, a 1966 album
Françoise Hardy (1968 album), Vogue CLD-728